Hans Verèl (21 April 1953 – 9 November 2019) was a football defender and midfielder from the Netherlands, who played for Sparta Rotterdam, SVV and FC Den Bosch.

Playing career
Verèl made his debut for Sparta on 20 May 1973 against Den Bosch, but only managed to play one league game for the club. In 1976 he left for SVV.

Managerial career
A persistent injury ended his career while playing for Den Bosch in 1978, and he became an assistant coach at the club. In 1982 he became head coach alongside general manager Ad Zonderland and they won promotion with Den Bosch to the Eredivisie in 1983. He later coached RBC Roosendaal, with whom he reached the 1985–86 KNVB Cup Final, NAC Breda, (SVV/)Dordrecht'90, RKC Waalwijk, FC Pakhtakor Tashkent (Uzbekistan), Willem II Tilburg and Fortuna Sittard. He also worked as an assistant to Jimmy Calderwood, Co Adriaanse and Hans Westerhof at Willem II and experienced the club's biggest success in qualification for the 1999–2000 UEFA Champions League.

Personal life
Verèl retired as a coach after his dismissal in Sittard and was director at a swimming centre in Roosendaal until 2015. He died in November 2019 after a long illness.

References

External links
 Profile  

1953 births
2019 deaths
Footballers from Rotterdam
Association football midfielders
Dutch footballers
Sparta Rotterdam players
SV SVV players
FC Den Bosch players
Dutch football managers
FC Den Bosch managers
RBC Roosendaal managers
NAC Breda managers
FC Dordrecht managers
RKC Waalwijk managers
Pakhtakor Tashkent FK managers
Willem II (football club) managers
Fortuna Sittard managers
Dutch expatriate football managers
Expatriate football managers in Uzbekistan
Dutch expatriate sportspeople in Uzbekistan
Willem II (football club) non-playing staff